The 5th Alpini Regiment is a regiment of the Italian Army's mountain infantry speciality, the Alpini, which distinguished itself in combat during World War I and World War II. The regiment is based in Sterzing and assigned to the Alpine Brigade "Julia".

History

Formation 
The 5th Alpini Regiment was formed on 1 November 1882. It consisted of three battalions: Val Dora, Moncenisio and Valtellina, named after the valleys and localities from which their soldiers were recruited. In 1886 the battalions were renamed, taking their new names from the location of their logistic depot: Morbegno, Tirano, Edolo, and the newly formed Vestone.

World War I 

During World War I the regiment consisted of 16 battalions and saw heavy fighting in the Alps regions of the Italian front against Austro-Hungarian and German forces. During the war the regiment consisted of the following battalions (pre-war battalions in bold, followed by their first and second line reserve battalions):

  Morbegno, Val d'Intelvi, Monte Spluga, Monte Mandrone
  Tirano, Valtellina, Stelvio, Tonale
  Edolo, Val Camonica, Monte Adamello, Monte Ortler
  Vestone, Val Chiese, Monte Suello, Monte Cavento

During the war 268 officers and 6,307 soldiers of the regiment were killed, and 499 officers and 10,745 soldiers were wounded. The regiment's Alpini Battalion "Morbegno" was awarded a Silver Medal of Military Valour during the war.

Interwar years 
On 1 September 1920 the Alpini Battalion "Trento" was raised by the 5th Reggimento Alpini, which on 1 July 1921 was transferred together with the Alpini Battalion "Vestone" to the 6th Alpini Regiment. On 10 September 1935, the 2nd Alpine Division "Tridentina" was formed, which consisted of the 5th Alpini Regiment, 6th Alpini Regiment, and 2nd Mountain Artillery Regiment.

World War II 

On 21 June 1940 (one day before the French surrender) the Tridentina advanced with other Italian units into Southern France. Later in 1940 the division was then sent to Albania, where it sustained heavy losses in the Greco-Italian War. In April 1941 the German Wehrmacht came to the aid of the beaten Italian armies in Albania through the invasion of Yugoslavia. Afterwards the Tridentina was repatriated for rest and refit.

In September 1942 the Tridentina under command of General Luigi Reverberi was sent with the 3rd Alpine Division "Julia", 4th Alpine Division "Cuneense" and other Italian units to the Soviet Union to form the Italian Army in Russia ( abbreviated as ARMIR) and fight alongside the German Wehrmacht against the Red Army. Taking up positions along the Don River, the Italian units covered part of the left flank of the German Sixth Army, which spearheaded the German summer offensive of 1942 into the city of Stalingrad.

After successfully encircling the German Sixth army in Stalingrad the Red Army's attention turned to the Italian units along the Don. On 14 January 1943, the Soviet Operation Little Saturn began and the three alpine division found themselves quickly encircled by rapidly advancing armored Soviet Forces. The Alpini held the front on the Don, but within three days the Soviets had advanced 200 km to the left and right of the Alpini. On the evening of 17 January the commanding officer of the Italian Mountain Corps General Gabriele Nasci ordered a full retreat. At this point the Julia and Cuneense divisions were already heavily decimated and only the Tridentina was still capable of conducting combat operations. As the Soviets had already occupied every village bitter battles had to be fought to clear the way out of the encirclement. The remnants of the Tridentina were able to break the Soviet encirclement in the Battle of Nikolayevka on 26 January 1943, allowing 4,250 Tridentina survivors (out of 15,000 troops deployed) to reach German lines, which were reached on the morning of 28 January. By then the men of the 5th Alpini Regiment had walked 200 km, fought in 20 battles and spent 11 nights camped out in the middle of the Steppe. Temperatures during the nights were between -30 °C and -40 °C. 

The few survivors of the 5th Alpini Regiment were repatriated and after the signing of the Armistice of Cassibile on 8 September 1943, the regiment was dissolved 10 September 1943 in the vicinity of the city of Brixen.

Cold War 

After World War II the 5th Alpini Regiment was reformed on 1 January 1953, in the city of Meran with The battalions "Tirano" and "Edolo". the regiment was the infantry component of the newly formed Alpine Brigade "Orobica". In 1956 the "Morbegno" battalion was raised again.

During the 1975 army reform the army disbanded the regimental level and newly independent battalions were given for the first time their own flags. On 30 November 1975 the 5th Alpini Regiment was disbanded and on the same day the regiment's Alpini Battalion "Morbegno" in Sterzing was assigned the flag and traditions of the 5th Alpini Regiment.

Before being disbanded in 1975 the structure of the 5th Alpini Regiment was as follows:

  5th Alpini Regiment, in Meran
  Command and Services Company, in Meran
  Alpini Battalion "Morbegno", in Sterzing
  44th Alpini Company
  45th Alpini Company
  47th Alpini Company
  107th Mortar Company
  Alpini Battalion "Tirano", in Mals
  46th Alpini Company, in Glurns
  48th Alpini Company
  49th Alpini Company, in Glurns
  109th Mortar Company
  Alpini Battalion "Edolo", in Meran
  50th Alpini Company
  51st Alpini Company
  52nd Alpini Company
  110th Mortar Company

Current structure 

On 27 July 1991 Alpine Brigade "Orobica" was disbanded and the Alpini Battalion "Morbegno" was transferred together with the Alpini Battalion "Edolo" and the Mountain Artillery Group "Bergamo" to the Alpine Brigade "Tridentina". On 8 August 1992 the Alpini Battalion "Morbegno" was elevated to 5th Alpini Regiment without changing size or composition. In autumn 2002 5th Alpini Regiment was transferred to the Alpine Brigade "Julia".

As of 2022 the regiment is based in Sterzing in the province of South Tyrol, making it the north most based regiment of the Italian Army. The regiment is operationally assigned to the Alpine Brigade "Julia".

  Regimental Command
  Command and Logistic Support Company
  Alpini Battalion "Morbegno"
  44th Alpini Company "L’Ardita"
  45th Alpini Company "L’Fer"
  47th Alpini Company "L’Audace"
  107th Maneuver Support Company "Là Dove Voglio"

The Command and Logistic Support Company fields the following platoons: C3 Platoon, Transport and Materiel Platoon, Medical Platoon, and Commissariat Platoon.

Equipment 
The Alpini companies are equipped with Bv 206S tracked all-terrain carriers, Puma 6x6 wheeled armored personnel carriers and Lince light multirole vehicles. The maneuver support company is equipped with 120mm mortars and Spike MR anti-tank guided missiles.

Military honors 
After World War II the President of Italy awarded the 5th Alpini Regiment twice Italy's highest military honor, the Gold Medal of Military Valour, for the regiment's conduct and sacrifice during the Greco-Italian War and Italian campaign on the Eastern Front:

  Greco-Italian War, awarded 9 June 1948
  Italian campaign on the Eastern Front, awarded 31 December 1947

See also
 7th Alpini Regiment
 8th Alpini Regiment
 Alpine Brigade Julia
 Italian Army

External links 
 Italian Army Website: 5° Reggimento Alpini
 5th Alpini Regiment on vecio.it

Sources 
 Franco dell'Uomo, Rodolfo Puletti: L'Esercito Italiano verso il 2000 - Volume Primo - Tomo I, Rome 1998, Stato Maggiore dell'Esercito - Ufficio Storico, page: 473

References 

Alpini regiments of Italy
Regiments of Italy in World War I
Regiments of Italy in World War II
Military units and formations established in 1882
Military units and formations disestablished in 1943
Military units and formations established in 1953
Military units and formations disestablished in 1975
Military units and formations established in 1992